Coming off a World Series victory, the 1992 Minnesota Twins continued the team's winning spree.  The team finished in second place to the Oakland Athletics and did not make it to the postseason.  This would be the team's last winning season until 2001.

Offseason
 January 29, 1992: Bill Krueger was signed as a free agent by the Twins.
 March 17, 1992: Denny Neagle and Midre Cummings were traded by the Twins to the Pittsburgh Pirates for pitcher John Smiley.
 March 28, 1992: Paul Sorrento was traded by the Twins to the Cleveland Indians for Oscar Múñoz and Curt Leskanic.

Regular season
The Twins' All-Star representatives at Jack Murphy Stadium in San Diego were outfielder Kirby Puckett, closer Rick Aguilera and second baseman Chuck Knoblauch.
On July 24, pitcher Scott Erickson threw the only complete-game one-hitter in Twins history -- Tom Brunansky got the only hit for the Boston Red Sox.
In a 6-2 win over Seattle on September 9, the Twins stole six bases to set a single-game club record.
On September 27, Tom Kelly won his 523rd game as Twins manager, more than any other skipper in team history.
Chili Davis joined Roy Smalley Jr., on October 2, as the only Twins to homer from both sides of the plate in a single game. Davis went right-handed off Kansas City's Chris Haney, then left-handed off Steve Shifflett.  
The highest paid Twin in 1992 was John Smiley at $3,400,000, followed by Hrbek at $3,100,000.

Offense

Outfielder Kirby Puckett got 200 hits for the fifth time in his career, as well as 100 runs and 100 RBI.  He also hit over .300 for the seventh time in nine seasons.  Finally, he hit the first three grand slams of his career.  He was twice named American League Player of the Month.  Puckett would go on to win his fifth Silver Slugger Award.

Chuck Knoblauch and Shane Mack also notched 100 runs, making Puckett, Knoblauch, and Mack the first trio of Twins in team history to score 100 times in a season.

First baseman Kent Hrbek began his fight against the injury bug, getting only 394 at-bats, a number that would decline over the next two years.  Catcher Brian Harper had the second of three seasons batting over .300.  Scott Leius saw a majority of the time at third base, but hit only .249 with 2 home runs.  In his last year with the Twins, shortstop Greg Gagne hit .246 — right around his career average.  Pedro Muñoz saw a majority of the time in right field, while Chili Davis served as the designated hitter in his second and last year with the Twins.

Pitching

The first four pitchers in the starting rotation had winning records and solid ERAs, including John Smiley (16-9, 3.21), Kevin Tapani (16-11, 3.97), Scott Erickson (13-12, 3.40), and Bill Krueger (10-6, 4.30).  The fifth spot in the rotation was a question mark, with Pat Mahomes making 13 mediocre starts, Willie Banks 12 poor starts, and Mike Trombley 7 reasonably capable ones.

The bullpen was outstanding, anchored by closer Rick Aguilera.  Aguilera earned 41 saves, and became the Twins' all-time leader in saves on September 1 when he earned his 109th with the team.  The four regular arms in the bullpen all had ERAs under three: Carl Willis, Mark Guthrie, Tom Edens, and Gary Wayne.

Defense

As expected for a Tom Kelly team, the defense was strong.  Puckett would win the last of his six Gold Glove Awards.  Hrbek was always strong at first base (although Don Mattingly prevented him from winning a Gold Glove), as was Knoblauch at second (at least at this point in his career).  Gagne was a capable shortstop, but Leius was a question mark at third with a .955 fielding percentage.  Mack and Muñoz had good years defensively alongside Puckett.

Season standings

Record vs. opponents

Notable transactions
 January 7, 1992: Mauro Gozzo was signed as a free agent with the Minnesota Twins.
 April 15, 1992: Enrique Wilson was signed as an amateur free agent by the Twins.
 June 1, 1992: 1992 Major League Baseball draft
Dan Serafini was drafted by the Twins in the 1st round (26th pick).
Gus Gandarillas was drafted by the Twins in the 3rd round.
Dan Naulty was drafted by the Twins in the 14th round.
Scott Watkins was drafted by the Twins in the 23rd round.
 August 31, 1992: Bill Krueger was traded by the Twins to the Montreal Expos for Darren Reed.
 November 17, 1992: Jayhawk Owens was drafted by the Colorado Rockies from the Minnesota Twins as the 23rd pick in the 1992 expansion draft.

Roster

Player stats

Batting

Starters by position
Note: Pos = Position; G = Games played; AB = At bats; H = Hits; Avg. = Batting average; HR = Home runs; RBI = Runs batted in

Other batters
Note: G = Games played; AB = At bats; H = Hits; Avg. = Batting average; HR = Home runs; RBI = Runs batted in

Pitching

Starting pitchers 
Note: G = Games pitched; IP = Innings pitched; W = Wins; L = Losses; ERA = Earned run average; SO = Strikeouts

Other pitchers 
Note: G = Games pitched; IP = Innings pitched; W = Wins; L = Losses; ERA = Earned run average; SO = Strikeouts

Relief pitchers 
Note: G = Games pitched; W = Wins; L = Losses; SV = Saves; ERA = Earned run average; SO = Strikeouts

Other post-season awards
Calvin R. Griffith Award (Most Valuable Twin) – Kirby Puckett
Joseph W. Haynes Award (Twins Pitcher of the Year) – John Smiley
Bill Boni Award (Twins Outstanding Rookie) – Mike Trombley
Charles O. Johnson Award (Most Improved Twin) – Mark Guthrie
Dick Siebert Award (Upper Midwest Player of the Year) – Dave Winfield
The above awards are voted on by the Twin Cities chapter of the BBWAA
Sherry Robertson Award (Twins Outstanding Farm System Player) – Marty Cordova

Farm system

References

External links
Player stats from www.baseball-reference.com
Team info from www.baseball-almanac.com
Twins history through the 1990s, from www.mlb.com
1992 Standings

Minnesota Twins seasons
Minnesota Twins
Twins